Enes Mameledžija (born 16 August 1949) is a Bosnian former professional footballer.

Career
He played his football in Yugoslavia for Iskra Bugojno then was traded FC Sète of France. He went on to play for Athlétic Club Arlésien (AC Arles). He was later traded to the Chicago Sting of the NASL.

References

External links
NASL player profile
Profile at naslsoccer.blogspot.com

1949 births
Living people
People from Travnik
Bosnia and Herzegovina footballers
Yugoslav footballers
Yugoslav expatriate footballers
NK Iskra Bugojno players
FC Sète 34 players
AC Arlésien players
Ligue 2 players
North American Soccer League (1968–1984) players
Chicago Sting (NASL) players
Expatriate footballers in France
Expatriate soccer players in the United States
Yugoslav expatriate sportspeople in France
Yugoslav expatriate sportspeople in the United States
Association football forwards